Panayiotis Kalorkoti (born 11 April 1957, Cyprus) is a British artist. He works primarily in acrylics and watercolour, and has also produced drawings, etchings, screenprints, lithographs and monotypes. His work is figurative and features bright colour, economic use of line and makes use of collage, whilst referring to conceptualism, abstraction and modernism.

Early life
Kalorkoti was born in Cyprus in 1957. He was raised in a poor family and moved to the United Kingdom in 1966. He became a British citizen in 1974. He studied at Newcastle upon Tyne University (1976–80) and the Royal College of Art, London (1982–85).

Career
Kalorkoti's work has been shown at the Imperial War Museum, London, National Portrait Gallery, London, and National Garden Festival, Gateshead. He has worked on major public projects, such as a residency at Grizedale Forest, Cumbria and has been artist in residence for the Leeds Playhouse and has won fellowships, scholarships and commissions. He was appointed the official war artist for the Falklands War.

Kalorkoti has been a part-time visiting lecturer at a number of art schools and won a Netherlands Government Scholarship (1986–87). He was appointed a Bartlett Fellow in the Visual Arts at Newcastle University in 1988 and was artist in residence at Cleveland County in 1992.

References

External links
Official website
British Council
Imperial War Museum
Artnet
Tyne & Wear Museums
British Library

Living people
1957 births
20th-century British painters
British male painters
21st-century British painters
Artists commissioned by the Imperial War Museum
British contemporary artists
British people of Greek Cypriot descent
Cypriot emigrants to England
Modern artists
Modern printmakers
Naturalised citizens of the United Kingdom
Alumni of Newcastle University
Alumni of the Royal College of Art
British printmakers
20th-century British male artists
21st-century British male artists